The Military Committee for National Recovery (CMRN) was a short-lived military government of Mauritania after the coup d'état that removed long-time President Moktar Ould Daddah on July 10, 1978, until a second coup on April 6, 1979. 

It was headed by Colonel Mustafa Ould Salek. It was followed by a second junta, the Military Committee for National Salvation (CSMN).

See also 
 Military Committee for National Salvation (CMSN) – Military government in 1979–92.
 Military Council for Justice and Democracy (CMJD) – Military government in 2005–07.
 High Council of State (HCE) – Military government in 2008–09.

References

History of Mauritania
Politics of Mauritania
Government of Mauritania
Mauritania